47th National Board of Review Awards
December 23, 1975
The 47th National Board of Review Awards were announced on December 23, 1975.

Top 10 films
Nashville, Barry Lyndon
Conduct Unbecoming
One Flew Over the Cuckoo's Nest
Lies My Father Told Me
Dog Day Afternoon
The Day of the Locust
The Passenger
Hearts of the West
Farewell, My Lovely
Alice Doesn't Live Here Anymore

Top Foreign Films
The Story of Adele H.
A Brief Vacation
Special Section
Stavisky
Swept Away by an Unusual Destiny in the Blue Sea of August

Winners
Best Picture (tie): 
Barry Lyndon
Nashville 
Best Foreign Film: 
The Story of Adele H.
Best Actor: 
Jack Nicholson - One Flew Over the Cuckoo's Nest
Best Actress: 
Isabelle Adjani - The Story of Adele H.
Best Supporting Actor: 
Charles Durning - Dog Day Afternoon
Best Supporting Actress: 
Ronee Blakley - Nashville
Best Director: 
Robert Altman - Nashville
Stanley Kubrick - Barry Lyndon
Special Citation: 
Ingmar Bergman, for outstanding translation of opera to screen, The Magic Flute

External links
 National Board of Review of Motion Pictures :: Awards for 1975

1975
1975 film awards
1975 in American cinema